() is a city located in Okinawa Prefecture, Japan. As of 2012, the city has an estimated population of 94,405, with 40,041 households and a population density of 4,838.8 persons per km2. The total area is 19.51 km2.

The city borders Chatan to the west, Okinawa City to the North, Urasoe to the south and Nishihara to the East.

History 
Ginowan was heavily damaged during World War II. After the war, half of the area of the city was allocated for use by the United States military. A refugee camp was built in the Nodake area of Ginowan. The population of the refugee camp increased exponentially, and the area was renamed Nodake City. The American occupation forces abolished Nodake City in 1946, and renamed the area Ginowan Village. Subsequently, the occupation authorities confiscated the main areas of Ginowan to build military bases. The area became a base town with military bases centered in Nodaka and Futenma.

Around 33% of Ginowan has been leased by the Japanese Ministry of Defense for use as U.S. military base under the Japanese and American mutual defense agreement.  and hosts part of the Marine Corps' Camp Foster.
Ginowan was elevated to city status on July 1, 1962.

Geography 

Ginowan is located in the south of Okinawa, and sits on the western coast of the island along the East China Sea. The city sits on gently-sloping coastal terrace composed of Ryukyuan limestone. 38% of the city is occupied by military bases used by the United States.

Neighboring municipalities
Clockwise, starting north, Ginowan borders on the following municipalities in Okinawa Prefecture:
Chatan
Kitanakagusuku
Nakagusuku
Nishihara
Urasoe

Its tourist attractions include two castle ruins.

Environmental Investigation
Japanese officials found dozens of abandoned metal drums in October 2013 when they entered the base with US permission to look for buried cultural property, The officials did not report this to the Ginowan city's mayor until March 2014. "No unusual odor or color change in soil" was detected and no health problems have been actively "reported by residents living around the base". Ginowan city government called the Japanese defense ministry to investigate for "possible environmental impacts". The Japanese Defense Minister Itsunori Onodera said: "We will take appropriate measures in cooperation with the United States and the city of Ginowan" as they plan environmental studies on soil in the week of March 18, 2014. The United States rarely allow environmental inspections on U.S. bases not planned for return to Japan.

Economy

Ginowan has been economically dependent on the United States military.
The city is home to taro, specifically the taimo (田芋) used in Okinawa cuisine. While the taimo remains the chief product of Ginowan, agriculture greatly declined in the city in the postwar period. Like other municipalities on Okinawa Island, the city produces cut flowers for sale on the home islands of Japan.

Arts and culture
The Okinawa Convention Center was constructed in Ginowan, and has hosted numerous international conferences. The city is also home to the Okinawa Prefectural Ginowan Marina, the Ginowan Municipal Museum, and the Sakima Art Museum.

Education
Ginowan was home to the former Okinawa International University Junior College.

Government
Ginowan is run by a city assembly of 28 elected members.

Transportation

Roads
Ginowan is crossed by Japan National Route 58, which stretches across segments of Kyūshū, Tanegashima, Amami Ōshima, and Okinawa,  and Japan National Route 330, which connects the city of Okinawa and the prefectural capital of Naha. Both highways are routed around the U.S. military bases. The Okinawa Expressway, which connects Nago to Naha, runs along the eastern border of the Ginowan.

References

External links

 

Cities in Okinawa Prefecture
Environmental monitoring